Sumathi is an Indian actress from Madurai, Tamil Nadu. She started her career at the age of two. She starred in many Malayalam, Tamil, Telugu,  Kannada, and Hindi language films.

Personal life
Sumathi was born in Madurai a city in Tamil Nadu India. Her father and mother were originally from Madurai. Her father managed several businesses such as photo studio and printing press. Her mother, was a housewife taking care of Sumathi and her seven brothers and three sisters. Her elder brother Master Prabhakar was the first one in the family to enter the film industry.

In 1966, Sumathi moved in with her Aunt along with Prabhakar to pursue her dreams. Sumathi entered the film industry when a director was looking for a young baby to play a role in a Malayalam film along with veteran actor Bharath Gopi.

Sumathi is married and settled in America with their daughter and son.

Career 
She started her film career in Tamil movies as a child actress (Baby Sumathi) by playing the role of daughter of Gopi in the late 60's. She appeared in many children's movies. She played dual roles and in some movies acted as a boy. Soon she moved to Telugu and Malayalam films, where she starred in many films.

As Baby Sumathi grew up, she took to modeling and started endorsing many products. She has won many Nandi and Filmfare awards as a child. She acted many films with her third elder brother Master Prabhakar and second younger brother Kumar. As soon as her brothers entered the film industry, most of her family members were interested to go on the same line. Sumathi's cousin was a well known actress who was successful in various Tamil films. Sumathi's other cousins were cinematography and assistant directors. Sumathi also dubbed for many actresses in the past in many languages.

In her acting career, she was often stereotyped as the girl next door. She acted with many stars such as M. G. Ramachandran, Sivaji Ganesan, Gemini Ganesan, Jaya Bachchan, Manorama, Nagesh, Rajinikanth, Jayalalithaa, Ambika, and Bhagyaraj to name a few. Her debut film, as heroine, was Bhagyaraj's directorial debut; Suvarillatha Chithirangal (1978) in Tamil. She gave up her acting career at the peak after her marriage in 1989 to move to America.

Awards

Child Artist awards in Malayalam
Baby Sumathi is a three-time winner Kerala State Film Award for Best Child Artist (female).
1969 Best Female Child Artist (female) Baby Sumathi - Nadhi 
1972 Best Female Child Artist (female) Baby Sumathi 
1977 Best Female Child Artist(female) Baby Sumathi - Shankupushpam

Filmography

Malayalam

Nadhi (1969) as Babymol
Kuttavali (1970) as Young Santhi
Kochaniyathi (1971) as Young Indu
Anubhavangal Paalichakal (1971) as Kumari
Thettu (1971) as Minimol
Muthassi (film) (1971) as Rekha
Panithiratha Veedu (1972)
Prathikaram (1972) as Leela
Professor (1972) as Rema
Sree Guruvayoorappan (1972)  
Achanum Bappayum (1972) as Young Amina
Maram (1973) 
Padmavyooham (1973) as Leenamol
Panitheeratha Veedu (1973) as Roshini
 Veendum Prabhatham (1973) as Young Ravi
Azhakulla Celina (1973) as Sajan
Kaamini (1974) as Young Seema
Moham (1974)  
Nagaram Sagaram (1974) 
Chandrakandam (1974) as Young Vinayan, Bindu (double role)
Poonthenaruvi (1974) as Young Valsamma
Jeevikkan Marannu Poya Sthree (1974)  
Bhoogolam Thiriyunnu (1974) as Gopi's daughter
Sethubandanam (1974) as in dual role as Kavitha / Saritha
Swamy Ayyappan (1975)  Young Girl
Chattambikkalyaani (1975) as Young Kalyani
Dharmakshetre Kurukshetre (1975) as
Soorya Vamsham (1975) 
Chief Guest (1975) 
Thiruvonam (1975) as Manju
Pravaham (1975) as Young Ragini
Hiridhayam Oru Kshethram (1976) as Sumam
Abhimaanam (1976) as Latha
Anubhavam (1976) as Young Mary
Chennay Valarthiya Kutty (1976) as Young Omana
Thulavarsham (1976) as Young Ammini 
Chottanikkara Amma (1976)
Shankupushpam (1977) as Mini
Sathyavan Savithri (1977) 
Hridayame Sakshi (1977)  
Sree Murukan (1977)  
Aradhana (1977)  
Sneha Yamuna (1977) 
Amme Anupame (1977) 
Aa Nimisham (1977)  
Veedu Oru Swargam (1977) 
Aasheervatham (1977) 
Aval Oru Devalayam (1977) 
Neethipeedham (1977)
Vidarunna Mottukal (1977)  Kanchana
Samudram (1977) as Bindu
Rathi Nirvedam (1978) as Shanthi
Kaithappo (1978) 
Avalude Raavukal (1978) 
Ashtamudikkayal (1978) 
Avalkku Maranamilla (1978)  
Aaru Manikkoor (1978)  
Mudra Mothiram (1978) as Amina
Sarapanjaram (1979) as Young Baby
Choola (1979)  
Radha Enna Pennkutti (1979)
Raathrikal Ninakku Vendi (1979)
Lajjavathi (1979) as Sandhya
Lovely (1979)
Pathivritha (1979)
Indhradhanussu (1979)
Maani Koya Kurup (1979)
Kanthavalayam (1980)
Vazhiyile Yathrakkar (1981)
Enne Njan Thedunnu (1983) as Janaki
Aval Kathirunnu Avanum (1986)

Tamil
Iru Kodugal (1969)
Vaa Raja Vaa (1969)
Thirudan (1969)
Avare En Deivam (1969)
 Thirumalai Thenkumari (1970)
 Penn Deivam (1970)
 Engirundho Vandhaal (1970)
 Engal Mama (1970) as Annie Pesant
 Thangaikkaaga (1971) as Young Radha
 Annai Velankanni (1971) 
 Justice Viswanathan (1971) 
Velli Vizha (1972)
 Appa Tatta! (1972)
Naan Yen Pirandhen (1972)
Dhikku Theriyadha Kaattil (1972) as Meena
Komatha En Kulamatha (1973) as Punithavathi
Karaikkal Ammaiyar (1973) as Valli
Swamy Ayyappan (1975) as Young Girl
Avandhan Manidhan (1975) as Selvi 
Vattathukkul Chaduram (1978)
Ennai Pol Oruvan (1978) as Shanthi
Suvarillatha Chithirangal (1979) as Saroja
Sigappukkal Mookkuthi (1979) as Janaki 
Saranam Ayyappa (1980)
Pennin Vazhkai (1981)
Ponnazhagi (1981)	
Azhagu (1984)
Naan Sigappu Manithan (1985)
Amman Kaatiya Vazhi (1991)

Telugu
Balaraju Katha (1970)
Manchivadu (1973) as Rani
Pasi Hrudayalu  (1973)
Bangaru Kalalu  (1974)
Urvashi  (1974) as Suguna & Aruna
Rakta Sambandhalu  (1975)
Swarganiki Nichchenalu  (1977)
Sangeeta (1981)

Kannada
 Mannina Magalu (1974)

Hindi
Ghar Ghar Ki Kahani (1970, film, as Baby Sumathi)
Swarg Narak (1978, film, as Baby Sumathi)

References

External links
 
 Baby Sumathi at MSI
 Kaathal Vaibhogame
 Balaraju Kadha - Mahabalipuram Mahabalipuram
 Balaraju Katha Movie

Tamil actresses
Year of birth missing (living people)
Actresses in Malayalam cinema
Living people
Actresses from Madurai
Actresses in Tamil cinema
20th-century Indian actresses
Actresses in Hindi cinema
Indian film actresses
Actresses in Kannada cinema
Actresses in Telugu cinema